Katherine Plunket (born as Catherine Plunket; 22 November 182014 October 1932) was an Anglo Irish aristocrat and artist from Ballymascanlan, County Louth, a prolific Botanical illustrator and painter. and the oldest person ever to be born and die in Ireland, and the fourth oldest-lived Irish person in history, having lived to 111 years and 327 days.

Biography
Plunket was born at Kilsaran, near Castlebellingham in County Louth, Ireland (then part of the United Kingdom, prior to the Anglo-Irish Treaty in 1921). The eldest of six children, one of whom died in infancy, she was a granddaughter of William Plunket, 1st Baron Plunket, Lord High Chancellor of Ireland. Her father Thomas Plunket, 2nd Baron Plunket (1792–1866), was a junior Church of Ireland clergyman when she was born and later became the Bishop of Tuam, Killala and Achonry, she was featured in numerous peerage books of the period including Whittakers.

Her mother Louisa Jane Foster (22 November 1794 – 14 January 1893) (married on 26 October 1819, Kilsaren) was the second daughter of Rebecca M'Clure and John William Foster of Fanevalley, County Louth, Member of Parliament for Dunleer, and was related to the Earl of Clermont. Her first and second cousins included three titled members of the Irish aristocracy. She was baptised Anglican in Kilsaran Church on 13 December 1820 as Catherine Plunket, though she spelt her name with a "K" for her entire life.

She inherited from her mother one of the family's ancestral homes, Ballymascanlon House near Dundalk, and oversaw the upkeep of the home and gardens until she contracted bronchitis at the age of 102 (her only serious health problem). The house is now a hotel.

Botanical illustration

With her younger sister Gertrude (1841–1924), Plunket travelled widely and visited almost every capital in Europe. With her sister, Frederica, she made many sketches of flowers in France, Italy, Spain and Germany, and Ireland.

These were bound in a volume named Wild Flowers from Nature which was presented in 1903 to the Royal College of Science, and was later transferred to the Museum of Science and Art in the National Museum of Ireland. In 1970 it was part of the collections which were transferred to the Irish National Botanic Gardens at Glasnevin.

Longevity record
Plunket was retrospectively recognised as having been the world's oldest living person after the death of Delina Filkins on 4 December 1928, when she was aged 108 years and 12 days. At the time of Plunket's death, she was credited with being the longest-lived Irish person in history, and not only lived longer than anyone who died in Ireland, but also the United Kingdom (as Ireland, at the time, was still a dominion of the UK) and at the age of 109 received a telegram from King George V. Her age was not surpassed by a citizen of the United Kingdom until 1970, when Ada Giddings Roe lived to be 12 days older. She was the last living person who had met the author Sir Walter Scott (1771–1832), when he stayed at her grandfather's house in Bray while she was visiting.

Plunket was included in the first-ever Guinness World Records (published in 1955), and is the only supercentenarian listed then to stand the burden of scrutiny in the years since.

Plunket attributed her longevity to the unrustled carefree aspect of her life. She died on 14 October 1932, a month shy of her 112th birthday; her death was recorded three days later in Ravensdale, County Louth and attributed to syncope. Her obituary was published in numerous Irish media publications, and in England in The Times. A telegram of condolence was sent to her relatives by King George V.

See also
 List of the oldest people by country
 Oldest people

References 

1820 births
1932 deaths
Botanical illustrators
Irish illustrators
Irish women painters
Irish Anglicans
People from Castlebellingham
19th-century Irish painters
20th-century Irish painters
19th-century Irish women artists
20th-century Irish women artists
Women supercentenarians
Irish centenarians
Daughters of barons